Sigmoria latior is a species of flat-backed millipede in the family Xystodesmidae. It is found in North America.

Subspecies
These four subspecies belong to the species Sigmoria latior:
 Sigmoria latior hoffmani Shelley, 1976
 Sigmoria latior latior (Brolemann, 1900)
 Sigmoria latior mariona Chamberlin, 1939
 Sigmoria latior munda Chamberlin, 1939

References

Further reading

 

Polydesmida
Articles created by Qbugbot
Animals described in 1900